Harry Lambert Murphy (1 April 15, 1885 – July 25, 1954) was an American operatic tenor.

Biography
He was born as Harry Lambert Murphy in Springfield, Massachusetts on 15 April 1885.

While pursuing an academic course at Harvard University, he studied singing under T. L. Cushman in Boston from 1904 to 1908. He graduated from Harvard in 1908 with his younger brother, Ray D. Murphy (1887–1964) (future chairman of the Equitable Life Assurance Society of the United States 19xx-1952), where they were both in the Harvard Glee Club, Harvard Quartet and the Pi Eta Society.

Having filled positions in several important churches in Boston, Brookline, and Fairhaven, he went to New York in 1910 as soloist of St. Bartholomew's Episcopal Church (Manhattan). After further study under Isidore Luckstone, he was engaged (1911) as a member of the Metropolitan Opera. Murphy made his reputation chiefly as a concert singer, appearing at many of the great festivals.

He was a popular recording artist for the Victor Talking Machine Company. One well-known recorded hit was "Smiles" from The Passing Show of 1918 and was popular during World War I. Lambert performed and recorded many duets with baritone Reinald Werrenrath. Mr. Murphy premiered in the tenor solo role in the quartets in Verdi's Requiem in Boston (year?). After retiring from active concert work, he gave private voice instruction. During World War II he was a product inspector for the Western Electric Company.

Lambert married Margaret Fraser. They had no children. They resided in Keene and Munsonville, New Hampshire, enjoying the outdoors, in particular, hunting and fishing.

Lambert died of throat cancer on July 25, 1954 in Hancock, New Hampshire.

References

External links
 Lambert Murphy recordings at the Discography of American Historical Recordings.

Musicians from Springfield, Massachusetts
American operatic tenors
1885 births
1954 deaths
Harvard University alumni
Deaths from throat cancer
People from Keene, New Hampshire
People from Nelson, New Hampshire
20th-century American male opera singers
Classical musicians from Massachusetts